The Codex Mediolanensis or Fragmentum Mediolanense, designated by g2 or 52 (in Beuron system), is a 10th or 11th century Latin manuscript of the New Testament. The text, written on vellum, is a version of the Vetus Latina. The manuscript contains the fragments of the Gospel of Luke, on only 2 parchment leaves. It was a lectionary.

It contains a fragments of the Acts of the Apostles 6:8-7:2; 7:51-8:4 on two folios. It was published by A. M. Ceriani.

The Latin text of the codex is a representative of the Western text-type in itala recension.

The manuscript was discovered by Ceriani. Currently it is housed at the Ambrosian Library (B. 168) in Milan.

See also 

 List of New Testament Latin manuscripts

References

Further reading 

 A. M. Ceriani, Monumenta Sacra et Profana e codicibus praesertim Bibliotecae Ambrosianae, Vol. I, part II (Milan, 1866), pp. 127-128.
 A. Jülicher, Itala. Das Neue Testament in Altlateinischer Überlieferung, Walter de Gruyter, Berlin, New York, 1976.

Vetus Latina New Testament manuscripts
10th-century biblical manuscripts